The Song Is My Story is an album by Abdullah Ibrahim. Most of the tracks are solo piano performances recorded in 2014.

Recording and music
The album was recorded in concert at the Fazioli concert hall in Sacile. Most of the tracks are solo piano performances by Abdullah Ibrahim; on two tracks he plays saxophone. Much of the material consists of his own compositions; some of the tracks are improvisations.

Release and reception

The Song Is My Story was released by Intuition Records in 2014, and by Sunnyside Records in 2015. A DVD of interviews and concert recordings was included.

The AllMusic reviewer commented: "Lyrical and intimate, this evocative concert showcases Ibrahim's distinctive, classical-influenced, free improvisation style.." John Fordham concluded that "Most of this music works in gently blooming harmonies and quiet melodic turns varied by the odd boppish flurry, though on 'Kalahari Pleiades' he hits an almost Jarrett-like groove. It's all played with a remarkable liquid touch, and feels like a late-life Ibrahim renaissance."

Track listing
"Celestial Bird Dance"
"Threshold"
"Open Door – Within"
"Unfettered – Muken"
"Spiral Mist"
"Just Arrived
"Kalahari Pleiades"
"For Coltrane"
"Twelve by Twelve"
"Shadows Lean Against My Song"
"The Song Is My Story – URA"
"Marinska"
"African Dawn"
"Eclipse at Dawn"
"Phambili – Looking Ahead"
"For Coltrane"
"Children Dance"

Personnel
Abdullah Ibrahim – piano, saxophone (tracks 1, 17)

References

2014 albums
Abdullah Ibrahim albums
Solo piano jazz albums